The 2022 Rangpur City Corporation election was a Bangladeshi local governmental election held on 27 December 2022. The City Corporation elections are held every five years, and this was the third of its kind in Rangpur. The mayor and 33 ward councilors of the corporation will be elected in this election. A total of 9 candidates are contesting in the mayoral election, and other 246 contesting for general councils and reserved (women) seats.

It is the only city currently held by the Jatiya Party (Ershad), the current opposition party in the Jatiya Sangsad. It is also one of the two city corporations which is held by other parties except Awami League. According to political analysts, the elections holds significance for the current Awami League-government and the newly formed Election Commission under Kazi Habibul Awwal- because election commissions under this government is accused by the Bangladesh Nationalist Party of being a 'puppet commission' of the government to turn Bangladesh into a de facto one-party state under Awami League. As Cumilla City Corporation's mayoral past was lost by Bangladesh Nationalist Party to Awami League in an election in June same year, the accusations rose.

Background 
City Corporations or City Councils are the highest tier among the local councils of Bangladesh, usually composed of cities or metropolitan areas. Elections are held every five years to elect the mayors and ward councilors. Ward councils are moreover divided administrative parts of a city, and the number of wards in a city depends on the total administrative area. Ward councilors are elected for each ward by their ward residents. For every 3 wards, there is a reserved seat for women in the general council, they are also elected by the people. But the mayoral elections has been way more prioritized by them.

The Rangpur City Corporation (RpCC) comprises the metropolitan Rangpur. It is further divided into 33 wards. The corporation in Rangpur was founded in 2012 and the first election was held the same year, electing Sharfuddin Ahmed Jhantu as the first mayor.

Politically, the Rangpur region is considered a 'bastion' of Jatiya Party, with also consisting a large number Awami League supporters. In the past two elections, first was won by an Awami League candidate who was a past member of Jatiya Party and the last was won by a Jatiya Party candidate.

Candidacy

Mayoral election

Results

Mayoral election

Council election

Party-wise

Ward-wise

Responses

Notes

References 

2022 elections in Bangladesh
2022 in Bangladesh
Rangpur City Corporation
Local elections in Bangladesh
December 2022 events in Bangladesh